Julie Anne Haddock (born April 3, 1965, Los Angeles, California) is an American  actress, music executive and producer.

Career
Becoming a child actress at the age of ten, Haddock is perhaps best known for her role as tomboy Cindy Webster on the first season of the NBC television series The Facts of Life. She is also known for her appearance on the Wonder Woman television series as the superpowered girl Amadonna in the episode "The Girl from Ilandia" and as Robert Duvall's daughter in the movie The Great Santini.  She also appeared in the main cast of two NBC series that were both cancelled mid-season of their first year: in 1977, she played Melinda Mulligan, the daughter of Lawrence Pressman and Elinor Donahue, on the Mulligan's Stew; in 1983 she appeared on Boone, starring Tom Byrd. She also appeared in an episode of Little House on the Prairie, as Amelia Bevins.

In 2008, Haddock, along with Molly Ringwald, Felice Schachter, and Julie Piekarski, was nominated for a TV Land Award, in the category Favorite Characters Who "Went Missing"

Filmography

Awards and nominations

References

External links

 
 

1965 births
American child actresses
American film actresses
American television actresses
Living people
Actresses from Los Angeles
21st-century American women